Calvin Lunsford Beale (June 6, 1923 – September 2, 2008) was an American demographer who specialized in rural population trends. He first identified a reverse in population decline in some rural areas, and his work led to development of the Beale code for categorizing rural development.

Life and career
Born in Washington, D.C., Beale graduated from Eastern High School and the Wilson Teachers College.

After earning a master's degree in sociology from the University of Wisconsin, he worked at the United States Department of Agriculture for 50 years.

In addition to his work as a demographer, Beale was noted for his photographs of county courthouses across the United States.

Death
Beale died of colon cancer in Washington, D.C.

References

External links
 

1923 births
2008 deaths
American demographers
Deaths from colorectal cancer
Deaths from cancer in Washington, D.C.
United States Department of Agriculture officials
University of Wisconsin–Madison College of Letters and Science alumni
People from Washington, D.C.
University of the District of Columbia alumni
 Eastern High School (Washington, D.C.) alumni